The Ranger Memorial is a tribute to the United States Army Rangers at Fort Benning, Georgia. The memorial serves as host to Ranger ceremonies such as Ranger retirement ceremonies to the graduation of the latest Rangers from the Ranger Indoctrination Program.

The original idea of the Ranger Memorial was drawn on a sketch by two Rangers in a mess hall. The idea was to form a permanent memorial to the contributions that Rangers have made to the defense of the United States and its allies throughout their long history. The construction was completed in 1994 with approximately 2,456 polished stones commemorating soldiers. In 1996, Phase II and 2,200 more memorial stones along with indirect lighting, sprinkler system, ledger stones, and a locater system for helping to find the Rangers on the walk.

This memorial is unique as its approval had to be met not only by the Ranger Memorial Foundation that started action, but also Fort Benning, TRADOC, and the Department of the Army.

The memorial is composed of a large Fairbairn–Sykes fighting knife sitting between two large marble pillars as the centerpiece. This knife was issued to British Commandos and subsequently to the men of the newly formed 1st Ranger Battalion while they were training with them in Achnacarry, Scotland. This knife later became a staple of the inventory of airborne troops as well as other special operations units during WWII.

Another unique part of this monument is the walkway to the centerpiece. It is composed of “purchased” stones by former and current Rangers with their unit information. No rank is indicated on the stones of the soldiers, only the word “Ranger” as the first line.

The criteria for stone purchase are very strict and not every person can be on the “Ranger Walk”. Anyone can buy a stone on the monument, but the stone has to be for a qualified Ranger.

References

External links
 National Ranger Foundation
 Official information site of the Ranger Memorial at Fort Benning

Military monuments and memorials in the United States
United States Army Rangers